Geophorus agglutinans is a species of tropical land snail with an operculum, a terrestrial gastropod mollusks in the family Helicinidae.

Description

Distribution

References

 GBIF info
 Discover Life info

Helicinidae